Pyare Lal Sankhwar (born 10 March 1955) is an Indian politician and social worker. He was member of 13th Lok Sabha. He was elected from Ghatampur (Kanpur Dehat) seat of Uttar Pradesh on BSP ticket. He was also elected to Uttar Pradesh Legislative Assembly for two terms.

References
 http://164.100.47.132/LssNew/members/former_Biography.aspx?mpsno=398

1955 births
Living people
Bahujan Samaj Party politicians from Uttar Pradesh
India MPs 1999–2004
People from Uttar Pradesh
Lok Sabha members from Uttar Pradesh
People from Kanpur Dehat district